Marianne Tso Wong Man-yin BBS FRSC (born 30 October 1944, Beijing) is a Hong Kong chemist.

Graduated from the Chinese University of Hong Kong, she obtained her master's degree at the University of Miami and doctoral degree at the University of Wisconsin-Madison. She continued her post-doctoral study at the Stanford University Medical Center. She is a fellow of the Royal Society of Chemistry and worked as the director of the Radioisotope Unit at the University of Hong Kong.

She was also the member of the Provisional Legislative Council (1996–98), member of the Chinese People's Political Consultative Conference National Committee and the executive committee member of the pro-Beijing political party Democratic Alliance for the Betterment and Progress of Hong Kong.

Her husband, Tso Wung-Wai, is also a well-known chemist and politician.

References

1944 births
Living people
Members of the Provisional Legislative Council
Democratic Alliance for the Betterment and Progress of Hong Kong politicians
Hong Kong Progressive Alliance politicians
Members of the National Committee of the Chinese People's Political Consultative Conference
Alumni of the Chinese University of Hong Kong
University of Wisconsin–Madison alumni
University of Miami alumni
Academic staff of the University of Hong Kong
Hong Kong scientists
Chemists from Beijing
Fellows of the Royal Society of Chemistry
Hong Kong Christians
Members of the Election Committee of Hong Kong, 2012–2017
Politicians from Beijing